Orecchiette (singular) are a pasta typical of Apulia, a region of Southern Italy. Their name comes from their shape, which resembles a small ear.

Description

An orecchietta has the shape of a small dome, with its center thinner than its edge, and with a rough surface. Like other kinds of pasta, orecchiette are made with durum wheat and water. Eggs are rarely used. In traditional Southern Italian home cooking, the dough is rolled, then cut into cubes. Each cube is pressed with a knife, dragging it on the board and making it curl (making a cavatello). The shape is then inverted over the thumb.

Names and variations

In Cisternino orecchiette are made with durum wheat; they are larger and take on a different shape, with deep internal ribs, very similar to an ear. They are defined  — that is, "priest's ears". The typical dish of holidays is orecchiette with rabbit ragout.

Cavatelli, strascinati (in the vernacular of Bari) and cencioni are made like orecchiette, without the final step of forming a concave shape. Strascinati and cencioni are typically larger than orecchiette.

In China, a similar type of pasta is called  (māo ěr duǒ, literally, "cat's ears").

Dishes
Orecchiette are typically served with a meat such as pork, capers and a crisp white wine.

The traditional dish from Apulia is orecchiette alle cime di rapa, a dish of orecchiette and rapini, also called turnip tops. Broccoli or cauliflower are also widely used as an alternative. Particularly around Capitanata and Salento, orecchiette are traditionally also dressed with tomato sauce, sometimes with miniature meatballs or a sprinkling of ricotta or ricotta forte.

The Italian cookbook Il cucchiaio d'argento (with an English translation The Silver Spoon) suggests that orecchiette are ideal for vegetable sauces.

See also

 List of Italian dishes

References

Sources

External links
 Orecchiette with Broccoli, Anchovies and Cherry Tomatoes from www.recipesfromitaly.com

Cuisine of Apulia
Types of pasta